Sarmad Bhatti (born 26 September 1991, Khairpur) is an international cricketer from Pakistan.

Career
In January 2010 he was part of the Pakistan squad for the ICC Under-19 Cricket World Cup in New Zealand.  Then in November, Bhatti was part of the team at the Asian Games in Guangzhou, China. He won a bronze medal as part of the team that defeated Sri Lanka in the third place playoffs.

In April 2018, he was named in Federal Areas' squad for the 2018 Pakistan Cup.

References

1991 births
Living people
People from Khairpur District
Pakistani cricketers
Cricketers at the 2010 Asian Games
Asian Games bronze medalists for Pakistan
Asian Games medalists in cricket
Federal Areas cricketers
National Bank of Pakistan cricketers
Islamabad Leopards cricketers

Medalists at the 2010 Asian Games